(born June 4, 1970) is a Japanese actor and director. He is perhaps best known for his roles in the Japanese cult films Versus, Battlefield Baseball, and Alive. He is a close friend of director Ryuhei Kitamura and appears in several of his films.

Career

Sexual assault allegations
In March 2022, four actresses came forward with allegations that, beginning in 2011, Sakaki had coerced them into non-consensual sexual relationships. Sakaki had admitted to having intercourse with three of the four women, claiming it was consensual; he denied having any kind of relationship with the fourth woman. Houka Kinoshita, a close friend of Sakaki who had also appeared in several of Sakaki's films, had also been accused of sexual assault by three different women. The victims allege that Kinoshita and Sakaki collaborated in sexual coercion by introducing young women to each other that were looking to break into the film industry. Shortly after the allegations surfaced, Sakaki's wife Izumi released a statement apologizing to the victims and confirming to end her marriage with Sakaki.

Filmography

Film

Television

References

External links
Japanmusic

1970 births
Living people
People from Nagasaki Prefecture
Japanese film directors
Japanese male film actors